American Love is the fifth studio album by American country music artist Jake Owen. It was released on July 29, 2016, through RCA Nashville. It includes the #1 single "American Country Love Song".

Reception

AllMusic's Stephen Thomas Erlewine rated the album 3.5 out of 5 stars, noting the "bittersweet streak" in some of the song's themes, as well as Owen "modulating his delivery, choosing to lie back instead of lean into the songs, a tactic that gives the lighter moments a melancholy pull and the ballads a bit of grace." Daniel Patrin of Renowned for Sound rated the record 3 out of 5 stars, noting that it reverts to Owen's "deeper, ancestral country roots" and away from Days of Golds "contemporary concoction of electronic pop-country mixtures", concluding that "American Love is the resulted work of a beholden musician, content and satisfied – rolling through songwriting without a shroud of guilt and a wealth of glittering pride."

Commercial performance
The album's lead single "American Country Love Song" topped the Billboard Country Airplay chart on September 17, 2016. The second single "If He Ain't Gonna Love You" stalled on the charts at its peak of #37 for several weeks, and became Owen's lowest charting single of his career. American Love debuted at number 4 on the Billboard 200 with 35,000 units, Owen highest charting album on that chart. It also debuted at number one on the Top Country Albums chart, selling 29,400 albums in its first week. The album has sold 53,800 copies in the United States as of November 2016. The album's third single, "Good Company" released to country radio on April 17, 2017.

Track listing

Personnel
Credits for American Love adapted from AllMusic.
Vocals

Stephanie Chapman – background vocals
Ross Copperman – background vocals
Jaren Johnston – background vocals
Hillary Lindsey – background vocals
Shane McAnally – background vocals 
Erin McCarley  – background vocals
Josh Osborne – background vocals
Jake Owen – lead vocals, background vocals 
Chris Stapleton – background vocals

Instruments

Joseph Arick – Hammond B-3 organ, harmonica, keyboards, piano
Lukas Bracewell – banjo, acoustic guitar, electric guitar, nylon string guitar, ukulele
Ross Copperman – bass guitar, acoustic guitar, electric guitar, keyboards
Dan Dugmore – pedal steel guitar
Fred Eltringham – drums, drum loops, percussion
Robby Emerson – bass guitar
Ryan Gore – clapping, tambourine
Lee Hendricks – bass guitar
Myron Howell - drums, percussion
Scotty Huff – trumpet
Luke Laird – acoustic guitar, electric guitar
Tony Lucido – bass guitar
Rob McNelley – electric guitar
Josh Osborne – acoustic guitar
Jake Owen – clapping
Russ Pahl – pedal steel guitar
Jovan Quallo – saxophone
Danny Rader – acoustic guitar, electric guitar, Hammond B-3 organ, synthesizer, tres, Wurlitzer
Josh Scalf – trombone
Matt Stanfield – Hammond B-3 organ, keyboards, piano
Aaron Sterling – drums, percussion
David Wallace – electric guitar
Derek Wells – acoustic guitar, electric guitar
Nir Z – drums, percussion

Production

Joseph Arick – programming
Daniel Bacigalupi – mixing
Sean R. Badum – assistant 
Joe Baldridge – engineer
Drew Bollman – assistant 
Lukas Bracewell – engineer, producer, programming 
Ross Copperman – digital editing, engineer, producer, programming
Josh Ditty – assistant 
Ryan Gore – engineer
Kelsey Granda – production assistant 
Luke Laird – producer, programming
Jasper Lemaster – assistant 
Joseph Llanes – photographer
Kam Lutcherhand – assistant 
Tony Lucido – engineer 
Shane McAnally – producer
Andrew Mendleson – mastering
Buckley Miller – digital editing
Seth Morton – assistant 
Justin Niebank – digital editing, mixing
Zack Pancoast – engineer
Jake Owen – producer
Andy Selby – digital editing
Aaron Sterling – engineer 
Brian David Willis – digital editing

Chart performance

Weekly charts

Year-end charts

References

2016 albums
Jake Owen albums
RCA Records albums
Albums produced by Shane McAnally
Albums produced by Ross Copperman